The Ch'ŏngjinhang Line, or Ch'ŏngjin Port Line, is an electrified freight-only railway line of the Korean State Railway in North Korea, connecting Ch'ŏngjin Ch'ŏngnyŏn Station at the southern junction of the P'yŏngra and Hambuk lines with Ch'ŏngjin Port.

History
Originally called Ch'ŏngjinbudu Line or Ch'ŏngjin Wharf Line, it was originally opened on 1 July 1940 by the Chosen Government Railway, running  from the former site of Ch'ŏngjin Station to Ch'ŏngjinbudu Station.

Route 

A yellow background in the "Distance" box indicates that section of the line is not electrified.

References

Railway lines in North Korea
Standard gauge railways in North Korea